Douradina is a municipality in the state of Paraná in the Southern Region of Brazil. The population is 8,869.

References

Municipalities in Paraná